The New Zealand cricket team's tour of Sri Lanka in 1992–93 was the second Test cricket series played in Sri Lanka since the previous New Zealand tour of the country had been cut short following the Colombo central bus station bombing in 1987. The tour was almost called off before it had started following a suicide bomb attack which saw the assassination of Vice-Admiral Clancy Fernando and three other naval officers by Tamil separatists. The assassination took place only 50 metres from the team's hotel in Colombo and led to several players returning home.

The tour took place in November and December 1992. New Zealand had toured Zimbabwe immediately before flying to Sri Lanka to play three Test matches and three One Day Internationals (ODIs), a series of matches which Wisden described as being intended as "a confidence-boosting exercise to develop some of New Zealand's emerging players". Following the suicide bombing one Test match was cancelled and a number of replacement players joined the tour party. Sri Lanka won the Test series 1–0, with one match drawn, and the ODI series 2–0, with the first ODI ending without a result following heavy rain.

Tour party
A fifteen-man squad had been announced on 4 September for both the tour of Zimbabwe and the subsequent tour of Sri Lanka, with the side's established wicket-keeper Ian Smith having retired following the 1992 Cricket World Cup. Before the tour of Zimbabwe began two players, Chris Cairns and Danny Morrison, were replaced due to injuries, with Simon Doull and Mark Haslam called into the side. Doull was injured during the tour of Zimbabwe and was replaced by Chris Pringle for the Sri Lankan leg of the tour. The side was captained by Martin Crowe, with Andrew Jones as vice-captain. The tour manager was Leif Dearsley.

The tour party was initially made up of:

Following the bombing in Colombo, which occurred close to the New Zealand team's hotel, the team considered abandoning the tour. A vote initially split the players and Peter McDermott, the chairman of the New Zealand Cricket Board, flew to the country to negotiate with them. Wisden reported that McDermott was concerned about compensation that would need to be paid to the Sri Lankan Cricket Board if the tour was cancelled and was under pressure from the New Zealand government which wasiaming to improve trade-relations with Sri Lanka. He convinced enough players to continue the tour, although Crowe was critical of the decision and considered that he had been directed to continue as captain against his wishes.

Five players, Greatbatch, Larsen, Latham, Patel and Watson, chose to leave the tour and return to New Zealand, as did the team coach Warren Lees. They were replaced by Grant Bradburn, Michael Owens, Justin Vaughan and veteran batsman John Wright, who had previously made himself unavailable for the tour. Crowe took over as the main coach for the team. Owens and Vaughan were the only uncapped players on the tour; both made their international debut in the first Test match.

Sri Lanka were captained by Arjuna Ranatunga throughout the tour.

Tour itinerary
The tour was originally scheduled to include three Test matches, with matches due to be played at Kandy from 21 to 26 November, Moratuwa from 5 to 10 December and at Colombo from 12 to 17 December. Following the suicide bombing in Colombo this was reduced to two Tests, with no match played at Kandy and the dates of the other matches on the tour changed. A three-day warm up match which was scheduled to start on 17 November, the day after the bombing, was cancelled and replaced by two one-day matches against a Sri Lankan Cricket Board XI.

The New Zealand team flew from Zimbabwe to Singapore before transferring to Sri Lanka.

Test series
The revised two-match Test series was won 1–0 by Sri Lanka, with the first Test drawn.

First Test

Second Test

One Day International series
Sri Lanka won the series 2-0 with one match ending as no-result.

Notes

References

1992 in New Zealand cricket
1992 in Sri Lankan cricket
1992-93
International cricket competitions from 1991–92 to 1994
Sri Lankan cricket seasons from 1972–73 to 1999–2000